Scaphandridae is a family of sea snails, marine gastropod mollusks in the superfamily Philinoidea.

Taxonomy 
Scaphandridae was considered as a synonym of Cylichnidae in the taxonomy of the Gastropoda by Bouchet & Rocroi, 2005).

However, Malaquias et al. (2009) reinstated Scaphandridae as a valid family.

Genera 
 † Alicula Eichwald, 1830
 † Ellipsoscapha Stephenson, 1941 
 Kaitoa Marwick, 1931
 † Maoriscaphander Dell, 1950 
 † Mirascapha Stewart, 1927 
 Nipponoscaphander Kuroda & Habe, 1971
 † Priscaphander Finlay & Marwick, 1937 
 Sabatia Bellardi, 1877
 Scaphander Montfort, 1810
 † Taita (gastropod)|Taita Laws, 1948 
Genera brought into synonymy
 †: Abderospira Dall, 1896 synonym of Roxania Leach, 1847
 Assula Schumacher, 1817: synonym of Scaphander Montfort, 1810 (objective synonym of Scaphander)
 Brocktonia Iredale, 1915: synonym of Scaphander Montfort, 1810
 Bucconia Dall, 1890: synonym of Scaphander Montfort, 1810
 Bullocardia F. Nordsieck, 1972: synonym of Scaphander Montfort, 1810
 Damoniella Iredale, 1918: synonym of Roxania Leach, 1847 (Unnecessary replacement name for Roxania)
 Gioenia Bruguière, 1789: synonym of Scaphander Montfort, 1810 (suppressed by ICZN Opinion 287)
 Leucophysema Dall, 1908: synonym of Roxania Leach, 1847
 Meloscaphander Schepman, 1913: synonym of Scaphander Montfort, 1810
 Micraenigma Berry, 1953: synonym of Diniatys Iredale, 1936
 Nipponoscaphander Kuroda & Habe in Kuroda, Habe & Oyama, 1971: synonym of Scaphander Montfort, 1810
 Sabatina Dall, 1908: synonym of Scaphander Montfort, 1810
 Tricla Philippson, 1788: synonym of Scaphander Montfort, 1810 (Invalid: Placed on the Official Index by ICZN Opinion 287)

References

External links